The Boston Society of Film Critics Award for Best (Lead) Actor is one of the annual film awards given by the Boston Society of Film Critics.

1980s

1990s

2000s

2010s

2020s

Multiple winners
Daniel Day-Lewis - 4
Colin Farrell - 2
Denzel Washington - 2

References

Boston Society of Film Critics Awards
Film awards for lead actor